For Funerals to Come... is a four-song EP released by Katatonia in 1995.  It was re-released on vinyl together with Brave Murder Day by Century in 2009 (150 orange and 350 yellow). It was re-issued again by Peaceville Records in November 2011.

Track listing 
 "Funeral Wedding" – 8:40
 "Shades of Emerald Fields" – 5:24
 "For Funerals to Come..." – 2:50
 "Epistel" – 1:13

2011 track listing
 "Funeral Wedding" – 8:40
 "Shades of Emerald Fields" – 5:24
 "For Funerals to Come" – 2:50
 "Epistel" – 1:13
 "Black Erotica" – 9:08
 "Love of the Swan" – 6:53

 Music by Nystrom
 Lyrics by Renkse except "Shades of Emerald Fields" by Le Huche
 "Black Erotica" and "Love of the Swan" were taken from the W.A.R. Compilation – Volume One album, which was released in 1995 by Wrong Again Records, recorded at Unisound Studios in June 1994

Personnel 
Band
 Jonas Renkse – vocals, drums
 Anders Nyström – guitars, additional vocals
 Guillaume Le Huche – bass

Production
 Dan Swanö – mixing, engineering

References 

1995 EPs
Katatonia EPs
Avantgarde Music EPs